Keith Leon Potger  (born 21 March 1941) is an Australian musician. He is a founding members of the Australian folk-pop group the Seekers. He was born in Ceylon (now Sri Lanka) and is of Burgher descent. In 1969, Potger and his business partner David Joseph co-founded the contemporary English pop group the New Seekers. Potger also records and performs as a solo artist.

In September 2014, along with his colleagues in the Seekers, Potger was appointed an Officer of the Order of Australia (AO).

Early life
Keith Potger was born on 21 March 1941 in Colombo, Ceylon (now Sri Lanka), to Justin Vere Potger (1914-1990) and Joan Frances Meier (1920-2004). His two brothers are Ralph and Nigel. At age 6, Potger's family migrated to Australia and he began teaching himself to play the banjo, guitar and keyboard. While at Melbourne High School, Potger performed in vocal groups which evolved into the Seekers in early 1962. The lineup of the Seekers then consisted of Athol Guy, Bruce Woodley, Ken Ray and Potger. When Ray left the group in late 1962, Judith Durham joined and they focused on the folk and gospel music boom, accompanying themselves on guitars, banjo and double bass.

The Seekers

The Seekers consisted of Judith Durham, Athol Guy, Bruce Woodley and Potger, an ABC radio producer. Through Potger's position, the three were able to make a demo tape in their spare time. This was given to W&G Records, which wanted another sample of Durham's voice before agreeing to record a Jazz Preachers' album. W&G instead signed The Seekers for an album, Introducing The Seekers, in 1963. Potger does not appear on the album cover because he was not allowed to have a second job.

In early 1964, the Seekers sailed to the United Kingdom on the S.S. Fairsky, on which the group provided the musical entertainment. Originally, they had planned to return after ten weeks, but they received a steady stream of bookings through the Grade Agency because they had sent the agency a copy of their first album. On 4 November 1964 at EMI's Abbey Road Studios, the Seekers recorded "I'll Never Find Another You" composed and produced by Tom Springfield and subsequently released in December 1964. In February 1965, the song reached number one in the UK and Australia, while their 1966 recording of Springfield and Jim Dale's "Georgy Girl" (from the film of the same name) reached number two (Billboard chart) and number one (Cashbox chart) in the United States.

In 1967, the Seekers set an official all-time record when more than 200,000 people (nearly one tenth of the city's entire population at that time) flocked to their performance at the Sidney Myer Music Bowl in Melbourne. Their TV special The Seekers Down Under scored the biggest TV audience ever (with a 67 rating), and early in 1968 they were all awarded the nation's top honour as "Australians of the Year 1967". On a tour of New Zealand in February 1968, Durham advised the group that she was leaving The Seekers and subsequently left in July 1968.

In the 1990s, 2000s and 2010s, the Seekers reunited and toured extensively. In September 2014, each of them was appointed an Officer of the Order of Australia (AO).

The New Seekers

When the Seekers disbanded in 1968, Potger's musical activities turned to songwriting and record production in major recording studios in the UK. The New Seekers are an English pop group, formed in London in 1969 by Potger. The idea was that the New Seekers would appeal to the same market as the original Seekers, but their music would have pop as well as folk influences. They achieved worldwide success in the early 1970s with hits including "I'd Like to Teach the World to Sing", "You Won't Find Another Fool Like Me" and "Beg, Steal or Borrow".

The New Seekers' second album, Keith Potger and the New Seekers, released in 1970,  is their only one to feature Potger as a member.

Solo career
Returning to Australia in 1978, Potger wrote and produced television jingles and music tracks as well as performing solo concerts throughout the 1980s. In 1988, he wrote and produced stage musicals for the Australian Bicentenary. In 2004, Potger released his first solo album, Secrets of the Heart. This was followed by Sunday in 2007 and in 2010, with Smile Now.

Popular culture
In November 2018, Potger coined the word "mynonym" to be an autological synonym for the word palindrome.

Personal life
On 18 November 2006, Potger married Australian actress Nicola Paull in front of six witnesses and a celebrant on the Mornington Peninsula. They divorced on 8 February 2014. The following year, Potger was reportedly living in Braidwood, New South Wales.

Potger's previous two marriages were to Pamela Potger (1994–2004; divorced), and British swimmer Pamela Powley (22 January 1966 – 1984; divorced), from which they had two children. Their son Matthew (born in London, 1967) is an actor and composer.

Honours and awards

The Seekers
 In 1966, The Seekers (Judith Durham, Athol Guy, Bruce Woodley, Keith Potger) received the Carl Alan Award for Best New Group (1965) at the Top Of The Pops Awards, in London.
In 1968, Potger and the other members of The Seekers were named jointly and severally Australians of the Year 1967.
In 1995, Potger and the other members of The Seekers were inducted into the Australian Record Industry Association (ARIA) Hall of Fame.
In the 1995 Australia Day Honours, Potger, along with the other members of The Seekers, was awarded the Medal of the Order of Australia (OAM).
In 2006, Potger and the other members of The Seekers were presented with the Key to the City by Melbourne's Lord Mayor, John So.
In 2012, Potger and the other members of The Seekers were honoured by Australia Post with a special Legends Of Australian Music postage stamp.
In the 2014 Queen's Birthday Honours, Potger, along with the other members of The Seekers, was advanced as an Officer of the Order of Australia (AO).
In 2013, Potger and The Seekers received the Ted Albert Award from the Australian Performing Rights Association (APRA) for Outstanding Services to Australian Music.  
In 2015, Potger, along with the other members of The Seekers, was inducted into the Music Victoria Hall of Fame.

CMMA
In 1983, Potger won a Golden guitar award and was inducted into the Roll of Renown at the Tamworth Country Music Awards of Australia (CMAA)

|-
| 1983 || "Used to Be a Gold Song" with Allan Caswell || Song of the Year || 
|-

Discography

Albums

References

External links
Official website

The Seekers at the MILESAGO website

The Seekers members
Living people
1941 births
Officers of the Order of Australia
Sri Lankan emigrants to Australia
Burgher musicians
People from Colombo
People from British Ceylon
People educated at Melbourne High School
The New Seekers
Acoustic guitarists
Australian guitarists
Australian expatriates in the United Kingdom
20th-century Australian male singers
Australian folk-pop singers
Australian male guitarists
Australian male singer-songwriters